Hazelton is a village located at the junction of the Bulkley and Skeena Rivers in northern British Columbia, Canada. It was founded in 1866 and in 2011 had a population of 305. The nearby larger community of New Hazelton is the northernmost point of the Yellowhead Highway, a major interprovincial highway which runs from Prince Rupert, British Columbia, to Portage la Prairie, Manitoba.

The Hazelton area comprises two municipalities (the Village of Hazelton and District of New Hazelton), three unincorporated settlements (South Hazelton, Two Mile and the Kispiox Valley), four First Nations’ villages: four of which are of the Gitxsan people Gitanmaax, Glen Vowell, Kispiox and Hagwilget.

First Nations history
The Hazeltons are home to the Gitxsan and Wet'suwet'en First Nations.

Old Hazelton and Two Mile

Hazelton is one of the oldest settlements in northern British Columbia; its European settlement dates back to 1866 when the Collins Overland telegraph went through.
Hazelton was the original gateway and staging area for the Omineca Gold Rush of 1869-73. It also had the only proper hospital for hundreds of miles in any direction. Another, less appreciated, distinction was in having dozens of roaming, foraging, and howling sled dogs, as nearly everyone had their own team and many were allowed to run free. Transportation options got better in 1891 when the Hudson's Bay Company’s sternwheeler Caledonia arrived from Port Essington. As the head of navigation on the Skeena, Hazelton played host to more than a dozen sternwheelers throughout the next twenty-two years.

Two Mile, a community two miles out of Hazelton, had a stopping house and a prosperous red-light district during the gold rush and rail construction. It currently houses 85% of the population in town.

Soon after 1868 Thomas Hankin, father of Constance Cox marked out a town site at the confluence of the Skeena River and the Bulkley River. He named it Hazelton because of the large number of hazelnuts ripening at the time.

New Hazelton and South Hazelton

The 1903 announcement that the Grand Trunk Pacific Railway would come through near Hazelton, caused a flurry of excitement and hundreds of settlers poured into the district, buying whatever land they could. Everyone was certain there was a fortune to be made and Hazelton was widely advertised as the "Spokane of Canada". What made Hazelton even more attractive was her mines, the Silver Standard, and the Rocher de Boule. In 1911, two rival townsites, Robert Kelly’s New Hazelton and the Grand Trunk Pacific’s South Hazelton, both came into existence and competed to sell the most lots. Thus, the original Hazelton was called "Old" and together they became known as the "Three Hazeltons". Where the railway station would be built was an issue for many years until both South and New Hazelton received one.

The first car in Hazelton 1911

The first car, a Flanders 20, arrived in Hazelton on the evening of October 4, 1911. It came from Seattle. The railway from Prince Rupert would not be completed until 1912, so it was brought in overland from Seattle. None of the people in town believed that story, as it was nearly impossible to walk into Hazelton overland in 1911, much less drive. The next day everyone went to go see the car where it was parked in front of the Hazelton Hotel and questioned the owner, PE Sands, on how he had accomplished the feat. At a banquet held in his honour later that evening, Sands revealed his secret. He had brought along a mechanic and they had often had to disassemble the car and load it onto mules. Clearly they'd had enough of doing that by the time they reached Hazelton. They packed the car up on a sternwheeler and went to Skeena Crossing (Gitsegukla), where the car was loaded on the Grand Trunk Pacific Railway for the trip to Prince Rupert. There the car was loaded on a coastal steamer for the trip back to Seattle. At a banquet given in Seattle by the Pacific Highway Association in November, he was presented with the Challoner & Mitchell trophy, a solid 14 ct. gold medallion in the shape of a small wheel, now owned by the Village of Hazelton. The automobile is now on display at the Kittitas County Historical Museum in Ellensburg, Washington.

Climate
Hazelton has a humid continental climate (Köppen climate classification Dfb). Winters are cold but are milder than what the latitude may suggest, owing to Pacific air masses. However, Arctic air masses can push temperatures below , occurring on average three days per year. In an average summer, there are seven days where the temperature exceeds .

Demographics 

Notable people

 Cataline – a well-known packer. He served Hazelton throughout most of his career and also chose to retire in Hazelton.
 Sperry Cline – Boer War veteran, policeman and author
 Simon Gunanoot – respected Gitxsan
 Dave Hancock – 15th premier of Alberta
 Carol Huynh – 2008 freestyle wrestling Olympic gold medalist
 Cathy McMorris Rodgers – U.S. representative. Lived in Hazelton during her childhood between 1974 and 1984  
 Billy ThunderKloud - singer/entertainer, Nashville recording artist, 1975 Outstanding Indian of the Year, hereditary chief
 Dr. Horace Wrinch – arrived in Hazelton 1900. Built the first hospital in the northern interior of BC to serve both Indigenous & non-Indigenous communities. He was a doctor and surgeon; also a Methodist minister, farmer, magistrate, community leader, politician (MLA).

Attractions
 'Ksan Historical Village is a world-famous native heritage site located right where the Bulkley and Skeena rivers meet.
 Hagwilget Canyon Bridge is one of North America's highest suspension bridges.
 Steelhead fishing can be done at the nearby Kispiox River.

Special events
 Kispiox Valley Rodeo is held the first weekend in June,
 Kispiox Valley Music Festival is held the last weekend of July.
 Pioneer Day takes place on the second Saturday of August.
 Gitxsan Cultural Days takes place on the third weekend in August.

Book references
 The Far Land, Eva MacLean 
 The Skeena River of Destiny, Dr. RG Large 
 Pioneer Legacy Chronicles of the Lower Skeena River, Norma Bennet 
 A Thousand Blunders, the Grand Trunk Pacific Railway and Northern British Columbia, Frank Leonard 
 ‘’Barner, A.  Surgeon of the Skeena : a brief résumé of the life and work of Rev. Horace C. Wrinch, M.D., D.D., Hazelton, B.C’’. The Committee on Missionary Education, Literature Dept., Woman’s Missionary Society: [and] the United Church of Canada, [194?]
 ‘’The unmasking of Ksan’’. Eric Wilson

Musical references
 "Hazelton", on Hazeltons by Justin Vernon

See also
 1950 British Columbia B-36 crash, a crash near to Hazelton in 1950 of a nuclear-armed American bomber.

Notes

External links

Villages in British Columbia
Gitxsan
Skeena Country
Populated places in the Regional District of Kitimat–Stikine
Hudson's Bay Company trading posts